Pelistry ( "cove for ships") is a small settlement, situated east of Maypole and north of Normandy, in the east of the island of St Mary's in the Isles of Scilly, England. The name is first recorded in 1650 as Porthlistrye.

The main industries are farming and tourism; there is a camp site in Pelistry and nearby is the Carn Vean Tearoom.

The small islet of Toll's Island is situated in Pelistry Bay and can be reached on foot when the tide is low.

References

External links

Pelistry Farm

Hamlets in the Isles of Scilly
Populated places on St Mary's, Isles of Scilly